Hister civilis is a species of clown beetle in the family Histeridae. It is found in North America.

References

Further reading

 
 
 
 
 
 
 
 
 
 
 
 

Histeridae
Beetles described in 1845